Guangzhou Economic and Technological Development District (GETDD) is one of the first national economic development zones in China.

History
The development zone was established in 1984. It is located at 30 kilometres away east of Guangzhou downtown in an enclave in Luogang District. It has a developed area of 17.67 square kilometres. It is located at about 50–100 km away from Guangzhou Baiyun International Airport  and its closest port is Shenzhen Port.

There are six pillar industries in the zone, including chemical materials and products, electric machinery, foodstuffs, electronic equipment, metallurgy and metal fabricating, and beverages. The zone was merged to Luogang District, a new-form district in Guangzhou, in 2005.

References

External links
Guangzhou Economic and Technological Development Zone

1984 establishments in China
Huangpu District, Guangzhou
Special Economic Zones of China